Bulger is an unincorporated community in Lincoln County, West Virginia, United States. Its post office  is closed.

The community was named after Andrew Jackson Mullins (Bulger) from the local Mullins  family.

References

Unincorporated communities in Lincoln County, West Virginia
Unincorporated communities in West Virginia